Baltazar Dvorničić Napuly (1560 – 29 March 1634) was a Croatian Catholic cleric and lawyer. He is notable for establishing the first private law school in Zagreb, and for his efforts to establish the Croatian college in Austria.

Biography
A native of Koprivnica, he was a student at the University of Bologna from at least 1581. Some have claimed that he had previously studied in Graz and Vienna, but clear evidence is lacking. In Bologna he had earned his degrees in philosophy, theology, and both civil and canon law by 1588. From November 1589 to December 1591 he was principal of the Hungarian–Illyrian (Croatian) college in Bologna. At this time he wrote his book Methodica Processum Directio (1590), on civil law, which shows the fruits of his collaboration with his friends Gašpar Petričević and Ivan Kitonić. It was reprinted by Kitonić, without acknowledgement and under an altered title, in 1619.

In 1588, while still studying and writing, he was appointed as archdeacon of Varaždin, then in 1591 archdeacon of Gorički. Returning to Zagreb in 1597, he took up posts at Zagreb (Kaptol) cathedral, becoming in 1600 a custodian, and in 1601 a lecturer. In 1613 he was appointed prepositor (prepošt, the principal ecclesiastical dean of Zagreb Kaptol). He also served as a member in the Hungarian parliament, and chairman of the High Court or Banski stol. He wrote and published several books on law, and established the first private law school in Zagreb, where he taught both civil and canon law. He died on 29 March, 1634 in Zagreb. After his death, he left his money to the founding of the Croatian-language college at the University of Vienna, Collegium Croaticum Viennense.

Works
Methodical conduct of the procedure (Methodica processuum directio, 1590)

External links
Baltazar Dvorničić Napuly on Croatian Encyclopedia

Sources 
 

1560 births
1624 deaths
Croatian lawyers
University of Bologna alumni
People from Koprivnica
17th-century Croatian Roman Catholic priests
16th-century Croatian people